Fujiya Matsumoto (25 March 1932 – 12 March 2022) was a Japanese sailor. He competed in the 5.5 Metre event at the 1964 Summer Olympics.

References

External links
 

1932 births
2022 deaths
Japanese male sailors (sport)
Olympic sailors of Japan
Sailors at the 1964 Summer Olympics – 5.5 Metre
Place of birth missing
Snipe class sailors